The Dipolog City Port, originally and formerly known as the Galas Feeder Port, is a seaport in Dipolog, Philippines. It is owned and managed by the City Government of Dipolog.

History
The Port of Dipolog started as a landing area for smaller fishing boats or bancas. Later, the city government under the administration of Mayor Roseller Barinaga planned to erect docking platforms, and transform it into a feeder port to accommodate smaller sea vessels that cannot dock at nearby Port of Dapitan which is barely 12 kilometers away.

In 2007, the city government signified its plan to upgrade the feeder port into a passenger port and had made a memorandum of agreement between the city government and Philippine Ports Authority for the port's operation. From that time, there was no shipping company serving the port until in the year 2015. However, in 2018, allegations on the port's operation floated as then-First District Representative Bullet Jalosjos called for the port's immediate closure for it lacked port security forces like the Philippine Coast Guard, Philippine Drug Enforcement Agency, and the Philippine National Police Maritime Group.

On January 23, 2019, after four years of operating, the new Passenger Terminal was open to the public. In the same year, the Maritime Industry Authority opened a missionary route between Dipolog and Siaton, Negros Oriental, a municipality south of Dumaguete. On August 27 of 2020, the City Government, with the help of the Philippine Coast Guard, formally opened the Coast Guard Sub-Station situated within the grounds of the port.

Shipping firms and destinations
 Medallion Transport - Cebu City and Dumaguete
 Lite Ferries - Oslob, Cebu

Statistics

Incidents
 On the morning of May 31, 2019, onboard MV Lady of Joy of Medallion Transport, a mother jumped off that vessel with her seven-month-old infant as the ship was approaching Galas Port. Both the mother and the infant were rescued and brought to the nearest hospital for medical treatment.

See also
List of ports in the Philippines
Dipolog

References

Dipolog
Dipolog Port
Buildings and structures in Dipolog
Transportation in Mindanao